Zoticus may refer to:

People
Zoticus is a Latin masculine given name of Greek origin (from Zotikos, meaning "full of life"). Its French form is Zotique. It may refer to:

Zoticus of Comana (died 204), saint and bishop
Aurelius Zoticus (fl. c. 220), athlete and lover of the Roman emperor Elagabalus
Zoticus (3rd century), neo-Platonist philosopher
Zoticus the Priest, of Constantinople, Guardian of Orphans, Hieromartyr (c. 340) - Deceomber 30
Zoticus of Otrous (fl. 451–52), bishop
Zoticus (praetorian prefect) (511–512), praetorian prefect of the East
Paraspondylos Zotikos (15th century), poet and historian
Zotique Racicot (1845–1915), Canadian bishop

Other
Zoticus, a genus of flies